Undertone or Undertones may refer to:

Music
 Undertone series, a sequence of notes that results from inverting the intervals of the overtone series
 The Undertones, Northern Irish band
 The Undertones (album), 1979 album by The Undertones
 Northwestern Undertones, a cappella group at Northwestern University, Evanston, Illinois, United States

Other uses
 Operation Undertone, part of the Allied invasion of Germany in World War II
 Undertone (advertising company), a New York-based digital advertising company
 An underlying or implied tendency or meaning; a subtext
 Skin undertone, as it applies to cosmetics; see color analysis (art)
 Colour of a paint spread very thinly over a white surface

See also 
 Overtones (disambiguation)